Admiral Laforey was a French prize captured in 1796 that entered Lloyd's Register in 1797 with R. Smith, master, and Brickwood, owner.  She originally sailed between London and Martinique. She then became a London-based transport in 1800, and her master became J. Henderson. Her owner became Deverin, and then Dixon by 1801 when she was lost. Lloyd's List reported on 3 November 1801 that she had been lost at Shoeburyness while on her way from Portsmouth to London. Crew and material had been saved. Her entry in the Register of Shipping for 1802 is marked "LOST".

Citations

1790s ships
Ships built in France
Captured ships
Maritime incidents in 1801
Age of Sail merchant ships
Merchant ships of the United Kingdom
Shipwrecks of England